Abbasqoli khan Mo'tamad-dawla Javanshir was an Iranian statesman, first Minister of Justice of Iran from 1859 to 1862.

Biography 
Of Azerbaijani descent, he was born in Shusha, Karabakh Khanate to Abulfat agha Javanshir sometime after 1804. He became follower of Abbas Mirza as his father after his defection to Iranian side.

His first public duty was governorate of Kashan, a post he was appointed to by Mohammad Shah Qajar in 1835, replacing Tahmasp Mirza (son of Dowlatshah). He was replaced by Bahman Mirza Bahauddowleh later but returned to his post in 1837 and held on to this until 1841. He was appointed to be governor of Kerman in 1841, replacing Fazl Ali Khan Qarabaghi and held this post until 1843. In Kerman, he was forced to pay ransoms for enslaved people during Ebrahim Khan's protege Abulqasem Garrusi. His rule in Kerman was reported to be benevolent and merciful.

He was appointed to be military chief of Naser al-Din Mirza (then governor of Azerbaijan) by royal tutor Haji Mirza Aqasi in January 1848. After Naser al-Din's accession to throne in September 1848, he was sent to quell mutiny of a company of Azerbaijani troops garrisoned in Tehran against Amir Kabir and Shahsevan insurgency in Ardabil, Meshkinshahr and Qaradagh in 1849. He was replaced by Mohammad Reza Qajar in Ardabil and Qasim Qajar in Qaradagh.

He was appointed by Naser al-Din Shah Qajar to be first Minister of Justice of Iran in 1859 after dismissal of Mirza Aqa Khan Nuri and was given epithet Mo'tamad-dawla. He established secular courts in regions of Iran and barred local governors of conducting trials on their own. He died 3 year after attaining the post. He was followed by his brother Muhammad Ibrahim Motamad al-Mulk in this post.

References 

Ministers of Justice of Iran
Politicians from Shusha
Karabakh Khanate
Rulers of Kerman
History of Ardabil
Qajar governors
Azerbaijani nobility
19th-century births
1862 deaths
Year of birth unknown